Malabar plum is a common name for trees of tropical Asia in the family Myrtaceae and may refer to:

Syzygium cumini
Syzygium jambos